Krzysztof Piątek (born 1 July 1995) is a Polish professional footballer who plays as a forward for Italian  club Salernitana, on loan from Hertha BSC. He also represents the Poland national team.

He began his professional career with Ekstraklasa club Zagłębie Lubin. Over the course of four seasons, he scored 15 goals in 72 appearances for the team, before joining Cracovia in 2016, for whom he scored 32 goals across two seasons. In 2018, Piątek signed for Genoa in Italy's Serie A. After 19 goals in 21 competitive games in his first half-season, he transferred to AC Milan in January 2019, before signing for Hertha BSC a year later.

Club career

Early career
Piątek began his career with local side Niemczanka Niemcza and Dziewiątka Dzierżoniów (2006–2011). He then moved to Lechia Dzierżoniów of III liga in 2011.

Zagłębie Lubin 
Piątek signed for Zagłębie Lubin in 2013 and initially played in junior and reserve teams of the club. After the arrival of Piotr Stokowiec as the new coach, however, he was quickly promoted to the first team on 14 May 2014 and then made his Ekstraklasa debut on 18 May 2014 in a match against Cracovia. Over the course of the next season, he became a regular starter for Zagłębie, who played in I liga, the second tier of Polish football. He scored his first senior career goal on 12 September 2014 in a 1–0 win to Chrobry Głogów and his first brace on 31 October 2014 at Widzew Łódź. After earning promotion with the club, Piątek scored his first league goal on 14 August 2015 in a 2–1 win against Lech Poznań and helped the team finish third in the 2015–16 Ekstraklasa season, earning a medal and qualifying for European competitions for the first time in club's history since the championship winning team of 2006–07.

He played a total number of 85 matches for Zagłębie and scored 18 times, including appearances in the Polish Cup and UEFA Europa League qualifying stages.

Cracovia
In 2016, Piątek joined fellow Polish side Cracovia and over the course of the next two seasons, he scored 32 league goals in 65 appearances for the club. That tally included a haul of 21 goals during his second season which saw him end the 2017–18 Ekstraklasa
campaign as the third top goalscorer in Poland.

Genoa
On 8 June 2018, Piątek signed a four-year contract with Italian club Genoa for a reported fee of €4 million. He scored four goals, including a hat-trick in the opening 19 minutes, on debut in a 4–0 Coppa Italia win over Lecce. He made his Serie A debut on 26 August, scoring in the opening six minutes of the match in a 2–1 win over Empoli. The following week, he scored his first brace of the season in a 5–3 loss to Sassuolo, which was followed by another strike in a 4–1 loss to Lazio, thus becoming the first player since Andriy Shevchenko in 1999 to score five goals in his first four Serie A appearances.

During his following match, a 2–0 victory over Chievo, he scored his 10th goal across all competitions and in the process became the first player across Europe's major leagues to reach the milestone for the season. On 30 September, Piątek scored a brace inside three minutes in a 2–1 win over Frosinone to make it 8 goals in six matches, the best start to a season by a debutant since Karl Aage Hansen in the 1949–50 campaign. In his very next match, he became the first player since Gabriel Batistuta in the 1994–95 season to score in each of his first seven Serie A appearances when he netted in a 3–1 defeat to Parma.

AC Milan

On 23 January 2019, AC Milan announced the signing of Piątek on a contract lasting until 30 June 2023, for a reported fee of €35 million. He was signed as a replacement for Gonzalo Higuaín, who joined Chelsea, and he was assigned the number 19 shirt, previously worn by Leonardo Bonucci.

Piątek made his debut for Milan on 26 January, in a goalless home draw against Napoli, as a 71st-minute substitute for Patrick Cutrone. Three days later against the same opponents also at San Siro, he scored both goals in a 2–0 win in the Coppa Italia quarter-finals, and was given a standing ovation when he made way for Cutrone. On 3 February, Piątek scored his first league goal away to Roma, which ended 1–1. He then scored three goals in the next two consecutive matches: one against Cagliari Calcio and two against Atalanta, becoming the first Milan player to score in his first three starts in the league since Mario Balotelli in 2013.

Ahead of the 2019–20 Serie A season, Piątek switched to the number 9 shirt. He scored four league goals in the first half of the season before leaving the club.

Hertha BSC
In January 2020, Hertha BSC announced the signing of Piątek for a reported fee of €27 million, on a long-term contract. He was given the number 7 jersey.

Loan to Fiorentina
On 8 January 2022, he returned to Italy and joined Fiorentina on loan.

Loan to Salernitana
On 1 September 2022, Piątek joined Salernitana on loan with an option to buy.

International career
Uncapped, Piątek was included in Poland's preliminary 35-man squad for the 2018 FIFA World Cup, but was one of 12 players cut from the final team for the tournament in Russia.

He made his international debut on 11 September 2018, starting in a 1–1 friendly draw with the Republic of Ireland in Wrocław and making way for Mateusz Klich after 61 minutes. Exactly one month later, he made his competitive debut in a UEFA Nations League match against Portugal and scored the opening goal in a 3–2 defeat.

Regarded as an important player for the national team and ready to play alongside Robert Lewandowski and Arkadiusz Milik in an attacking trio, Piątek was forced to miss the postponed Euro 2020 due to ankle injury in May 2021 that required surgery and months of rehabilitation.

Style of play 
Piątek has been described as a "classic" "number 9" striker most efficient inside the opponent's penalty area, courtesy of his excellent positioning, accurate finishing, height, physical strength, and tenacity in aerial or physical challenges with opponents. His team play outside the penalty area and playmaking abilities have been cited as areas in need of improvement, however.

During his time in Genoa, Piątek played in a 3–5–2 formation as a main striker, usually on the left, most often supported by Christian Kouamé, a pacey forward with excellent dribbling and passing skills. In Milan, he became a lone striker in a 4–3–3 formation, supported by wingers on either side of the pitch.

Piątek has named Harry Kane and Robert Lewandowski as his two favourite strikers who he wishes to emulate. He has also cited Cristiano Ronaldo and Thierry Henry as his childhood inspirations.

Personal life
He is married to Paulina Procyk (a lawyer, born 1991). The wedding took place on 1 June 2019 in Castle of the Order of St. John in Łagów (Lubusz Voivodeship).

He is called by fans as "Il Pistolero" (the Gunslinger) due to his habit of Wild West celebration of gun-firing, associated with the 19th century United States.

Career statistics

Club

International

As of match played 16 November 2022. Poland score listed first, score column indicates score after each Piątek goal.

Honours
Zagłębie Lublin

 I liga: 2014/15

Individual
Coppa Italia Top scorer: 2018–19 (8 goals)

References

External links

1995 births
Living people
People from Dzierżoniów
Sportspeople from Lower Silesian Voivodeship
Polish footballers
Association football forwards
MKS Cracovia (football) players
Zagłębie Lubin players
Genoa C.F.C. players
A.C. Milan players
Hertha BSC players
ACF Fiorentina players
U.S. Salernitana 1919 players
III liga players
Ekstraklasa players
I liga players
Serie A players
Bundesliga players
2022 FIFA World Cup players
Poland youth international footballers
Poland under-21 international footballers
Poland international footballers
Polish expatriate footballers
Polish expatriate sportspeople in Italy
Polish expatriate sportspeople in Germany
Expatriate footballers in Italy
Expatriate footballers in Germany